Apodiscus is a genus of trees belonging to the family Phyllanthaceae first described as a genus in 1912. It contains only one known species, Apodiscus chevalieri, native to tropical West Africa (Guinea, Liberia and possibly Sierra Leone).

References

Phyllanthaceae
Phyllanthaceae genera
Monotypic Malpighiales genera
Flora of Guinea
Flora of Liberia